Garry Lewis Templeton (born March 24, 1956) is an American former professional baseball player and minor league manager. He played as a shortstop in Major League Baseball for the St. Louis Cardinals, San Diego Padres, and New York Mets from 1976 to 1991. He was inducted into the Padres Hall of Fame.

Playing career
In the latter year, Templeton made history as the first switch-hitter to collect 100 hits from each side of the plate, a feat achieved only once more by Willie Wilson in 1980. His total of 211 hits led the National League, and with 19 triples, he led the league for a third consecutive season. He led the Cardinals in hits in 1977, 1978, and 1979. He caused some controversy in 1979 when, despite having better numbers than either Dave Concepción or Larry Bowa, two of the National League's premier shortstops at the time, he wasn't selected to start at shortstop for the National League All-Star team. He was named to the team as a reserve, but refused to go.

The quote, "If I ain't startin', I ain't departin'" regarding the 1979 MLB All-Star Game is often mistakenly attributed to Templeton over his refusal to play.  In reality, Jack Buck, Cardinals sportscaster at the time made the statement.

He had desired a trade in 1979 upon asked to take a pay cut before relenting; he desired to bat lead off, which only furthered the ire of fans.

After the end of the season the Cardinals traded him to the Padres for Ozzie Smith. The trade was welcomed by everyone involved: Smith was (then) a light-hitting defensive wizard going to a team which needed to improve its defense (and he was also embroiled in a contract dispute with Padres' management), while Templeton was a better hitter going to a team which needed to improve its offense.

In his ten years with the Padres, he played in 1,286 games, while having 1,135 hits, 43 home runs, 427 RBIs, and a .252 batting average, with one Silver Slugger Award win and one All-Star Game appearance in 1985. He was named team captain of the Padres by manager Larry Bowa in 1987, serving as captain for four years. 1991 was his final season in the majors. He played in 32 games for the Padres before being traded to the New York Mets on May 31 for Tim Teufel Templeton played in 80 more games for the Mets for a total of 112 that year. He hit for .221 with three home runs and 26 RBIs in the season.

Templeton was inducted into the San Diego Padres Hall of Fame on August 8, 2015.

Managing career
After his retirement as an active player in 1991, Templeton remained in the game as a coach and minor league manager. From 1998 through 2001, he managed in the Anaheim Angels organization for four teams, posting a 294-272 record. From 2003 to 2004, he managed the Gary Railcats of the Northern League, moving on to manage the Golden Baseball League's Fullerton Flyers in 2005.  After three years with the Flyers, he would move on to manage the Arizona Winter League's Palm Springs Chill in 2008, then would return to the GBL to manage the Long Beach Armada in 2009. He managed the Chico Outlaws to the GBL Championship in 2010. On January 8, 2013, Templeton was named manager of the Newark Bears of the independent Can-Am League.

Personal life
His son, Garry Templeton II, played minor league baseball from 1999–2007. He managed the Hawaii Stars in 2012 and the Vallejo Admirals from 2014–15, winning the Pacific Association of Professional Baseball Clubs Manager of the Year Award in 2014. He is now a scout for the Arizona Diamondbacks organization.

See also
List of Major League Baseball career hits leaders
List of Major League Baseball career triples leaders
List of Major League Baseball career stolen bases leaders
List of Major League Baseball annual triples leaders

References

External links

1956 births
Living people
African-American baseball players
Arkansas Travelers players
Baseball players from Texas
Gary SouthShore RailCats managers
Gulf Coast Cardinals players
Major League Baseball shortstops
Minor league baseball managers
National League All-Stars
New York Mets players
People from Lockney, Texas
St. Louis Cardinals players
St. Petersburg Cardinals players
San Diego Padres players
Silver Slugger Award winners
Sonoma County Crushers players
Sports in Chico, California
Tulsa Oilers (baseball) players
21st-century African-American people
20th-century African-American sportspeople